The 2012–13 Sultan Qaboos Cup was the 40th edition of the Sultan Qaboos Cup, the premier knockout tournament for football teams in Oman.

The competition began on 30 November 2012 with the Round of 32 and concluded on 26 May 2013. Dhofar S.C.S.C. were the defending champions, having won their eighth title in 2011. On Sunday 26 May 2013, Al-Suwaiq Club were crowned the champions of the 2012 Sultan Qaboos Cup when they defeated Al-Nahda Club 2-0, hence winning the title for the third time.

Teams
This year the tournament had 32 teams. The winners qualified for the 2014 AFC Cup.
 Ahli Sidab Club (Sidab)
 Al-Bashaer Club 
 Al-Ittihad Club (Salalah)
 Al-Khaboora SC (Al-Khaboora)
 Al-Musannah SC (Al-Musannah)
 Al-Mudhaibi SC (Mudhaibi)
 Al-Nahda Club (Al-Buraimi)
 Al-Nasr S.C.S.C. (Salalah)
 Al-Oruba SC (Sur)
 Al-Rustaq SC (Rustaq)
 Al-Salam SC (Sohar)
 Al-Seeb Club (Seeb)
 Al-Shabab Club (Seeb)
 Al-Suwaiq Club (Suwaiq
 Al-Tali'aa SC (Sur)
 Al-Wahda SC (Sur)
 Bahla Club (Bahla)
 Bidia SC (Bidiya)
 Bowsher Club (Bawshar)
 Dhofar S.C.S.C. (Salalah)
 Fanja SC (Fanja)
 Majees SC (Majees)
 Mirbat SC (Mirbat)
 Muscat Club (Muscat)
 Nizwa Club (Nizwa)
 Oman Club (Muscat)
 Saham SC (Saham)
 Salalah SC (Salalah)
 Samail SC (Samail)
 Sohar SC (Sohar)
 Sur SC (Sur)
 Yanqul SC (Yanqul)

Round of 32
32 teams played a knockout tie. 16 ties were played over one leg. The first match played was between Fanja SC and Al-Nahda Club on 30 November 2012. 16 teams advanced to the Round of 16.

Round of 16
16 teams played a knockout tie. 8 ties were played over one leg. The first match was played between Al-Salam SC and Bowsher Club on 24 December 2012. 8 teams advanced to the Quarterfinals.

Quarterfinals
8 teams played a knockout tie. 4 ties were played over one leg. The first match was played between Al-Oruba SC and Al-Tali'aa SC on 25 February 2013. Al-Oruba SC, Al-Nahda Club, Dhofar S.C.S.C. and Al-Suwaiq Club qualified for the Semifinals.

Semifinals
4 teams played a knockout tie. 2 ties were played over two legs. The first match was played between Al-Suwaiq Club and Al-Oruba SC on 16 April 2013. Al-Suwaiq Club and Al-Nahda Club qualified for the Finals.

1st Legs

2nd Legs

Finals

References

External links
Oman Sultan Cup 2012-2013 at Soccerway.com
Oman Sultan Cup 2012-2013 at Goalzz.com
Oman Sultan Cup 2013-2014 Finals-Al-Suwaiq 2-0 Al-Nahda

Sultan Qaboos Cup seasons
Cup
Cup